Rhagodeya is a genus of solifuges or sun spiders.

Species 
This genus includes two species  from Libya, Somalia and Sudan:

 Rhagodeya nigra Caporiacco, 1937 
 Rhagodeya nubia Roewer, 1933

References 

Solifugae genera
Arachnids of Africa